Farebi is a 1974 Bollywood drama film directed by Suresh Issar & Sudesh Issar.

Cast
Bindu   
Moushumi Chatterjee as Dr. Meera
Anwar Hussain as SevakRam - Chacha
Jankidas as Manoharlal
Vinod Khanna as Shanker 'Ranjit'
Randhir as Vishwas Jindal  
Ranjeet   
Nirupa Roy as Maa Annapurna -  Ranjit's mother
Fariyal as Mona
C S Dubey as Murari

Music
"Ae Mere Dil Khushi Se Machal" - Kishore Kumar
"Jab Suni Ho Gali Hogi Khuli Khidki" - Asha Bhosle
"Mujh Preet Jataani Na Aayi Na Aayi" - Lata Mangeshkar
"O Maiya Beta Tujhko Pukaare Bholi Ma" - Narendra Chanchal
"O Sherawaaliye Teri Jai Pahaadawaaliye Teri Jai" - Narendra Chanchal
"Tu Kaun Hai Main Kaun Hoon Phir Tera Mera Saath Hai" - Lata Mangeshkar

References

External links
 

1974 films
1970s Hindi-language films
1974 drama films
Films scored by Laxmikant–Pyarelal